Trevor Treharne is a sports journalist who is currently editor of FourFourTwo.

Early life and education

Treharne was born in Essex, England, and was educated at the University of Brighton.

Awards

In 2009, he was a finalist in the Best Profiling of an Athlete, Team or Coach - Print Media category of the Australian Sports Commission Media Awards for his feature on Gold Coast United.  Later that year he was runner up for Journalist of the Year at the Publishers Australia Excellence Awards.  In 2010 he was runner up for Single Article of the Year at the Publishers Australia Excellence Awards,  while FourFourTwo won Integrated Media Brand of the Year, Website of the Year and the overall Publishers Australia Excellence Award.

References

External links
FourFourTwo website

Australian sports journalists
Living people
Year of birth missing (living people)